The BVA Open is a tennis tournament held in São José do Rio Preto, Brazil since 2011. The event is part of the ATP Challenger Tour and is played on outdoor clay courts.

Past finals

Singles

Doubles

References

External links
Official website

ATP Challenger Tour
Tennis tournaments in Brazil
Clay court tennis tournaments